The 2010 Malaysian motorcycle Grand Prix was the fifteenth round of the 2010 Grand Prix motorcycle racing season. It took place on the weekend of 8–10 October 2010 at the Sepang International Circuit.

MotoGP classification

Moto2 classification

125 cc classification

Championship standings after the race (MotoGP)
Below are the standings for the top five riders and constructors after round fifteen has concluded.

Riders' Championship standings

Constructors' Championship standings

 Note: Only the top five positions are included for both sets of standings.

References

Malaysian motorcycle Grand Prix
Malaysia
Motorcycle Grand Prix